This list of schools in Waterloo Region shows the colleges and universities, secondary schools, and elementary schools based in the Regional Municipality of Waterloo, Ontario, Canada.

Currently, four school boards operate in Waterloo Region.  Public schools with instruction in English are operated by the Waterloo Region District School Board and public schools with instruction in French are operated by the Conseil scolaire de district du Centre-Sud-Ouest.  Catholic schools with instruction in English are operated by the Waterloo Catholic District School Board and those with instruction in French are operated by the Conseil scolaire de district catholique Centre-Sud.

There are plans to construct a new French public secondary school in the region that will be part of the Conseil scolaire Viamonde; currently, there are no French public secondary schools in the region and public school students must travel to Hamilton in order to receive their education in French at the secondary school level.

Universities and colleges
Conestoga College
Emmanuel Bible College
Heritage College & Seminary
University of Waterloo
Wilfrid Laurier University

Secondary schools

Baden
Public
Waterloo-Oxford District Secondary School

Breslau
Private
Woodland Christian High School
St. John's-Kilmarnock School

Cambridge
Public
Galt Collegiate Institute and Vocational School
Glenview Park Secondary School
Jacob Hespeler Secondary School
Preston High School
Southwood Secondary School
Catholic
Monsignor Doyle Catholic Secondary School
St. Benedict Catholic Secondary School
St. Louis Adult & Continuing Education
French Catholic
École secondaire Père-René-de-Galinée
Private
Laurel Academy of Canada
Ontario Muslim Academy/KIA Islamic Academy
Waterloo Independent Secondary School
Temple Baptist Christian Academy
Islamic School of Cambridge

Elmira
Public
Elmira District Secondary School

Kitchener
Public
Cameron Heights Collegiate Institute
Eastwood Collegiate Institute
Forest Heights Collegiate Institute
Grand River Collegiate Institute
Huron Heights Secondary School
Kitchener-Waterloo Collegiate and Vocational School (KCI)
Catholic
Resurrection Catholic Secondary School
St. Mary's High School
St. Louis Adult & Continuing Education
Private
Rockway Mennonite Collegiate
Sunshine Montessori School - Toddler to Grade 8 
Scholars' Hall - JK to Grade 12
Carmel New Church Secondary School Grades 9-10
St. Jude's Special Education School - Grades 3 to 11
Christ Lutheran School
Blyth Academy Waterloo - Grades 8 to 12
AIM Learning Community - Grades K to 6

Waterloo
Public
Bluevale Collegiate Institute
Sir John A. Macdonald Secondary School
Waterloo Collegiate Institute (WCI)
Catholic
St. David Catholic Secondary School
Private
St. Jude's School for Bright, Learning Disabled Students - Grades 3 to 11

Elementary schools
Public elementary schools can be junior (K–6 or K–5, marked *), senior (6–8 or 7–8, marked †), or comprehensive (K–8, marked ‡). All Catholic elementary schools are comprehensive.

Ayr
Public
Ayr Public School*
Cedar Creek Public School‡
Catholic 
 St. Brigid Catholic Elementary School

Baden
Public
Baden Public School‡
Sir Adam Beck Public School

Breslau 
Public
 Breslau Public School*

Cambridge
Public
Avenue Road Public School
Blair Road Public School
Centennial Public School
Central Public School
Chalmers Street Public School
Clemens Mill Public School
Coronation Public School
Elgin Street Public School
Grand View Public School
Hespeler Public School
Highland Public School
Hillcrest Public School
Manchester Public School
Moffat Creek Public School
Parkway Public School
Preston Public School
Ryerson Public School
Saginaw Public School
Silverheights Public School
St. Andrew's Senior Public School
Stewart Avenue Public School
Tait Street Public School
William G. Davis Public School
Woodland Park Public School
Catholic
Christ The King Catholic Elementary School
Holy Spirit Catholic Elementary School
Our Lady of Grace Catholic Elementary School
Our Lady of Fatima Catholic Elementary School
Saint John Paul II School
St. Anne Catholic Elementary School
St. Augustine Catholic School
St. Elizabeth Catholic School
St. Francis Catholic Elementary School
St. Gregory Catholic Elementary School
St. Joseph Catholic Elementary School
St. Margaret of Scotland Catholic Elementary School
St. Michael Catholic Elementary School
St. Peter Catholic Elementary School
St. Teresa of Calcutta Catholic Elementary School
St. Vincent De Paul Catholic Elementary School
Catholic French
École élémentaire catholique St. Noël Chabanel
Private
Cambridge Christian School
Islamic School Of Cambridge
Temple Baptist Christian Academy
Ontario Muslim Academy

Conestogo
Public 
 Conestogo Public School‡
Private
 Foundation Christian School‡

Elmira
Public 
 John Mahood Public School*
 Park Manor Senior Public School†
 Riverside Public School*
Catholic
 St. Teresa of Avila Catholic Elementary School

Floradale 
Public
 Floradale Public School‡

Hawkesville
Private
 Countryside Christian School (Conservative Mennonite)

Kitchener
Public 
 A.R. Kaufman Public School‡
 Alpine† Public School
 Bridgeport Public School*
 Brigadoon Public School*
 Chicopee Hills Public School (projected to open 2017)
 Country Hills Public School*
 Courtland Senior Public School†
 Crestview Public School*
 Doon Public School†
 Driftwood Park Public School*
 Forest Hill Public School*
 Franklin Public School*
 Glencairn Public School*
 Groh Public School (projected to open 2017)
 Howard Robertson Public School*
 J.F. Carmichael Public School*
 JW Gerth Public School
 Jean Steckle Public School
 Janet Metcalfe Public School*
 John Darling Public School*
 King Edward Public School*
 Lackner Woods Public School*
 Laurentian Senior Public School†
 Mackenzie King Public School*
 Margaret Avenue Senior Public School†
 Meadowlane Public School*
 Oak Creek Public School (opened 2022)
 Pioneer Park Public School*
 Prueter Public School*
 Queen Elizabeth Public School*
 Queensmount Senior Public School†
 Rockway Public School*
 Sandhills Public School*
 Sheppard Public School*
 Smithson Public School*
 Southridge Public School*
 Stanley Park Senior Public School†
 Suddaby Public School (opened 1857)*
 Sunnyside Senior Public School†
 Trillium Public School*
 W.T. Townshend Public School‡
 Westheights Public School†
 Westmount Public School*
 Williamsburg Public School*
 Wilson Avenue Public School*
Catholic
 Blessed Sacrament Catholic Elementary School
 Canadian Martyrs Catholic Elementary School
 John Sweeney Catholic School
 Monsignor R.M. Haller Catholic Elementary School
 Our Lady of Grace Catholic Elementary School
 St. Aloysius Catholic Elementary School
 St. Anne Catholic Elementary School
 St. Bernadette Catholic School
 St. Daniel Catholic Elementary School
 St. Dominic Savio Catholic School
 St. Kateri Tekwitha Catholic Elementary School
 St. John's
 St. Mark Catholic Elementary School
 St. Paul's
 St. Teresa Catholic Elementary School
 St. Timothy Catholic Elementary School
Private:
 Fellowship Christian School using the Classical teaching model – Grades JK to 8
 Laurentian Hills Christian School http://lhcs.net/ 
 Carmel New Church Elementary School JK–8 (established 1892)
 Scholars' Hall – JK to Grade 12
 St. Jude's School for Bright Learning Disabled Students – Grades 3 to 11

Linwood 
Public 
 Linwood Public School

Maryhill
Catholic 
 St. Boniface School

New Dundee
Public 
 New Dundee Public School*

New Hamburg
Public
 Forest Glen Public School‡
 Grandview Public School*
Catholic
 Holy Family Catholic Elementary School

St. Agatha
Catholic
 St. Agatha Catholic Elementary School

St. Clement
Catholic
 St Clement Catholic Elementary School

St. Jacobs
Public
 St. Jacobs Public School‡

Wallenstein
Private
 Pathfinder Christian School (Conservative Mennonite)

Waterloo
Public
Abraham Erb Public School*
Cedarbrae Public School (opened 1970)*
Centennial Public School (opened 1967)*
Edna Staebler Public School‡
Elizabeth Ziegler Public School (opened 1931)*
Empire Public School (opened 1954)*
Keatsway Public School (opened 1977)*
Laurelwood Public School‡
Lester B. Pearson Public School‡
Lexington Public School*
Lincoln Heights Public School (opened 1964)‡
MacGregor Public School (opened 1952)
Mary Johnston Public School (opened 1987)*
Millen Woods Public School
N.A. MacEachern Public School (opened 1974)*
Northlake Woods Public School
Sandowne Public School (opened 1975)*
Vista Hills Public School
Westvale Public School (opened 1991)*
Winston Churchill Public School*
Catholic
Holy Rosary Catholic Elementary School
Our Lady of Lourdes School (opened 1948)
St. Agnes Catholic Elementary School (opened 1956)*
St. Luke Elementary School (opened 2001)
St. Matthew Catholic Elementary School (opened 1995)
St. Nicholas Catholic School (opened 2001)
Sir Edgar Bauer Elementary School (opened 1970)*
*previously called Separate School

Public French
École élémentaire L'Harmonie
Catholic French
École élémentaire catholique Mère-Élisabeth-Bruyère
Private
Kitchener-Waterloo Bilingual School (opened 1965)
The K-W Montessori School Inc.
Maison Montessori Bilingual School
Scholars' Hall – JK to Grade 12
St. Jude's School for Bright, Learning Disabled Students – Grades 3 to 11

Wellesley
Public
 Wellesley Public School‡
Private
 Cedar Grove Christian Day School (Conservative Mennonite)
 Cornerstone Christian School (Conservative Mennonite)

Schools no longer in operation 
 North Wilmot Public School, Baden
 Alison Park Public School, Cambridge
 Dickson Public School, Cambridge
 Lincoln Avenue Senior Public School, Cambridge
 Little's Corners Public School, Cambridge
 Open Door Secondary School for Adults, Cambridge
 St. Ambrose Catholic Elementary School, Cambridge
 St. Clement Catholic Elementary School, Cambridge
 St. Francis Catholic Elementary School, Cambridge
 St. Mary Catholic Elementary School, Cambridge
 St. Patrick Catholic Elementary School, Cambridge
 Victoria Public School, Cambridge
 Heidelberg Public School, Heidelberg
 Christ Lutheran School, Kitchener
 Monsignor William Gleason Catholic School, Kitchener
 Notre Dame Catholic School, Kitchener
 Sacred Heart School, Kitchener
 St. Boniface School, Kitchener
 St. Francis School, Kitchener
 St. Joseph School, Kitchener
 St. Leo School, Kitchener
 St. Mary Elementary, Kitchener 
 St. Patrick School, Kitchener
 Victoria Public School, Kitchener
 Wilmot Senior Public School, New Hamburg
 Cecil Cornwall School, North Dumfries
 Dickie Settlement School, North Dumfries
 Three Bridges School‡, St. Jacobs (technically public, but de facto Conservative Mennonite school) 
 Alexandra Public School, Waterloo (opened 1909)
Brighton Public School, Waterloo (opened 1960) 
Central Public School, Waterloo (opened 1855, demolished 1952)
Erbsville Public School, Erbsville
Harold Wagner Public School, Waterloo (opened 1957)
Northdale Public School, Waterloo (opened 1959)
St. Louis Separate School, Waterloo (opened 1905)
St. Michael's School, Waterloo (opened 1959)
St. Thomas Aquinas, Waterloo (opened 1968)
Winterbourne Public School, Winterbourne
Bloomingdale Public School, Bloomingdale
Mary
Laurel Vocational School (opened 1968 and renamed as University Heights Secondary School c. 1989) and sold to Conestoga College to become North Campus

See also
List of school districts in Ontario
List of high schools in Ontario

References

Waterloo Region, Ontario